The BBCH-scale (sunflower) identifies the phenological development stages of the sunflower (Helianthus annuus).  It is a plant species specific version of the BBCH-scale.

1 Stem elongation may occur earlier than stage 19; in this case continue with the principal stage 3

References

External links
A downloadable version of the BBCH Scales

BBCH-scale